The 1984 Winston 500 was a NASCAR Winston Cup Series racing event that took place on May 6, 1984, at Alabama International Motor Speedway in Talladega, Alabama.

Background
Talladega Superspeedway, originally known as Alabama International Motor Superspeedway (AIMS), is a motorsports complex located north of Talladega, Alabama. It is located on the former Anniston Air Force Base in the small city of Lincoln. The track is a Tri-oval and was constructed by International Speedway Corporation, a business controlled by the France Family, in the 1960s. Talladega is most known for its steep banking and the unique location of the start/finish line - located just past the exit to pit road. The track currently hosts the NASCAR series such as the Monster Energy Cup Series, Xfinity Series, and the Camping World Truck Series.

Race report
Forty cars competed in this 188-lap race; 39 of them were born in the United States while Trevor Boys was born in Canada. This race featured 75 lead changes and laps exceeding 200 mph with unrestricted engines. The NBC TV coverage featured Bruce Jenner (now Caitlyn Jenner) as the pit reporter.

Some notable crew chiefs who participated in this race were Kenny Wallace, Junie Donlavey, Darrell Bryant, Joey Arrington, Cecil Gordon, Dale Inman, Waddell Wilson, Jake Elder, Harry Hyde, and Kirk Shelmerdine.

Four cautions covered 17 laps. Chevrolet was the manufacturer for the majority of the grid. Cale Yarborough defeated Harry Gant by two car lengths after nearly three hours of racing in front of more than 110000 audience members; marking the 80th race win in Yarborough's NASCAR Winston Cup Series career. 75 lead changes occurred; the most ever in NASCAR Cup Series history.

It would exceed the record set by the 1978 Talladega 500 for the number of leader changes in the race. This record would eventually be broken at the 2010 Aaron's 499 and be tied at the 2011 Aaron's 499. Since NASCAR only covered the lead changes that occurred at the end of each lap, there were many more lead changes that weren't officially recorded because they didn't last the whole lap.

Jimmy Means suffered an oil pressure problem on the sixth lap and ended up in last place. Bill Elliott, Terry Labonte, Dale Earnhardt, Rusty Wallace, and David Pearson all took turns being the leading the race. Phil Barkdoll would make his NASCAR debut in this race. Until the 2010 Sprint Cup Series season, this race was considered to be the most competitive in NASCAR history. The use of the Car of Tomorrow along with NASCAR's then-current Have at it, boys policy and smaller restrictor plates made the Monster Energy NASCAR Cup Series races at Daytona and Talladega more prone to passing.

Qualifying

Top 20 finishers

Standings after the race

References

Winston 500
Winston 500
NASCAR races at Talladega Superspeedway